Halyna Petrosanyak (born 1969) is a Ukrainian poet, writer and translator.

Life 
Halyna Petrosanyak was born in 1969 in a remote village in the Ukrainian Carpathians. She graduated in German and Russian studies from Vasyl Stefanyk Precarpathian National University.

Petrosanyak was among the authors linked to the group known as the Stanislav phenomenon. She debuted in 1996 with her poetry book Парк на схилі ("Park on the hill"). A poem from the publication was awarded with the Bu-Ba-Bu "Best Poem of the Year" award. Petrosanyak is also the laureate of Hubert-Burda-Preis für junge Lyrik (2007) and the Ivan Franko Prize (2010). Her works have appeared in various literary magazines and almanacs and have been translated into several languages, including English, German, Polish, Russian, Czech and Italian.

Petrosanyak works as a translator from Czech and German into Ukrainian. She has translated, among others, the autobiographies of Alexander Granach and Soma Morgenstern.

Publications

Poetry 

 Парк на схилі (“Park on the hill”), 1996
 Світло окраїн (“Light of outskirts”), 2000
 Спокуса говорити, 2008
 Екзофонія (“Exophonium”), 2019

Other 

 Політ на повітряній кулі, 2015 – essays and poetry
 Не заважай мені рятувати світ (“Don’t hinder me to save the world”), 2019 – short stories

References 

Ukrainian translators
Ukrainian women poets
21st-century Ukrainian women writers
1969 births
Living people